The Canadian Folk Music Award for French Songwriter of the Year is a Canadian award, presented as part of the Canadian Folk Music Awards to honour the year's best French-language songwriting. Unlike many songwriting awards, the nomination is given in consideration of all of the songwriting on a whole album rather than singling out individual songs. Awards are also presented for English Songwriter of the Year and Indigenous Songwriter of the Year.

2000s

2010s

2020s

References

French Songwriter
Songwriting awards